"Le Gorille" is a 1952 song by Georges Brassens, found on his album La Mauvaise Réputation. It was also released as a single, with La Chasse Aux Papillons as B-side.

Lyrics
The song describes how a group of women in a zoo observe the genitalia of a male gorilla. The animal suddenly escapes and all the women, except for a 100-year old lady, run away. The gorilla, who is in heat, mistakes a judge in a black robe for a woman and rapes him. Brassens later reveals that this very same judge had sentenced a man to the guillotine earlier that day and now, just like the convicted criminal, screams in vain for mercy.

Reception
Le Gorille was very controversial at the time of its release. First of all because of its pornographic lyrics, but secondly also because it took a stance against the death penalty when it was still in effect in France. It was banned on all French radio stations.

Covers
Le Gorille has been covered and translated several times:

 Fabrizio De André covered it in Italian as Il Gorilla (1968) on his album Volume 3. 
 Yossi Banai covered it in Hebrew as הגורילה (Ha-Gorila). Dan Almagor covered it in the same language. 
 Jake Thackray covered it in English as Brother Gorilla on his album Bantam Cock (1972).   
 Franz Josef Degenhardt covered it in German as Vorsicht Gorilla (1986). 
 Le Gorille has been covered by French singer Renaud on his album Renaud chante Brassens (1996). 
 Oulahlou covered it as Macahu, changing the gorilla with a donkey, the old lady with a young girl and the judge with a police officer. His song is a critique of the Algerian police force during the Black Spring.
 The Polish cover band Zespół Reprezentacyjny covered it as "Goryl". 
 Swedish-Dutch songer Cornelis Vreeswijk covered it as Djävulens sång on his album Visor, svarta och röda (1972).
 Christos Thivaois covered it as Ο Γορίλλας ("The Gorilla").
 Joaquín Carbonell covered it in Spanish as "El Gorila" ("The Gorilla").

Sources

French songs
Children's songs
1952 songs
Obscenity controversies in music
Songs about primates
Songs about judges
Songs about sexual assault
Black comedy music
Songs written by Georges Brassens
Georges Brassens songs
Gorillas in art
Protest songs
Works about capital punishment
Opposition to the death penalty
Censorship in France

fr:Le Gorille (chanson)